Robert Louis Tucker (born June 8, 1945) is an American former professional football player who was a tight end in the National Football League (NFL).  A 6'3", 230 lbs. tight end from Bloomsburg University, Tucker played for 11 seasons in the NFL, from 1970 to 1980, for the New York Giants and the Minnesota Vikings.

Tucker is one of the few Giants to play for the team in four different home stadiums: Yankee Stadium (1970 through the first two home games of 1973); the Yale Bowl (last five home games of 1973 and all of 1974); Shea Stadium (1975) and Giants Stadium (1976–77).

Prior to joining the NFL, Tucker played for several seasons in the Atlantic Coast Football League, including the Pottstown Firebirds and the Lowell Giants.

Tucker lived in Lincroft, a neighborhood in Middletown Township, New Jersey.

Tucker was inducted into the American Football Association's Semi Pro Football Hall of Fame in 1982.

Tucker was a biology teacher and freshman football coach at Acton-Boxborough Regional High School in Acton, Massachusetts in 1969.

See also
 History of the New York Giants (1925–78)
 Pottstown Firebirds

References

External links
 

1945 births
Living people
American football tight ends
Bloomsburg Huskies football players
Minnesota Vikings players
New York Giants players
High school football coaches in Massachusetts
People from Middletown Township, New Jersey
People from Hazleton, Pennsylvania
Players of American football from Pennsylvania